is a 2007 puzzle action role-playing video game for the Nintendo DS. It was announced at the Nintendo Conference 2005. It was able to connect to the Nintendo Wi-Fi connection service. This game has received translations into several languages including English for releases in Europe and Australia by Rising Star Games.

Story
Bomberman is a special agent, hired by "The Justice Department" to retrieve some stolen scientific data. It was later discovered that Professor Xeal and "The Lords of the Galaxy" were involved in the loss of this data, and so Bomberman begins his latest journey.

Multiplayer

The game allows connecting to other Bomberman games in multiplayer mode. The Japanese version of the game contained the "Battle Pack 1" version of the traditional Battle Mode, which allowed connecting to Bomberman Land Touch!. The European version doubled in ROM size (from 64 to 128MB) and was updated with "Battle Pack 2," which allowed connecting to the newer Bomberman Land Touch! 2 and Bomberman 2. Rising Star's web site still mistakenly states that Bomberman Story DS players can connect with Bomberman Land Touch!.

Rising Star's site also states that Bomberman Story DS can utilize the Nintendo Wi-Fi Connection for up to 8 players, although in the game WiFi is only for up to 4 players, as with Bomberman Land Touch!.

Reception

The game received "mixed" reviews according to the review aggregation website Metacritic. In Japan, Famitsu gave it a score of 27 out of 40.

References

External links
Official site
Rising Star's Official Game Micro site
Rising Star's Bomberman Story DS Page

2007 video games
Action role-playing video games
Story DS
Hudson Soft games
Multiplayer and single-player video games
Nintendo DS games
Nintendo DS-only games
Nintendo Wi-Fi Connection games
Rising Star Games games
Video games developed in Japan